Ghakhar may refer to:

Gakhars, a clan predominantly in present-day Punjab, Pakistan.

Ghakhar Mandi, a small city in northeastern Punjab, Pakistan